Keskvere may refer to several places in Estonia:

Keskvere, Lääne County, village in Martna Parish, Lääne County
Keskvere, Saaremaa Parish, village in Saaremaa Parish, Saare County
Keskvere, Pöide Parish, village in Pöide Parish, Saare County